Mouzaïa is a district in Blida Province, Algeria. It was named after its capital, Mouzaïa.

Municipalities
The district is further divided into 3 municipalities:
Mouzaïa
Aïn Romana
Chiffa 

Districts of Blida Province